Chapman Field Park is a  urban park in metropolitan Miami in  Miami-Dade County, Florida, in the southern part of Coral Gables, Florida on historic Old Cutler Road. Of its ,  remain as mangrove forests and saltwater estuaries;  is developed as a park.

History
The property was first used as an army airfield in World War I. It was later declared surplus and in 1923 the United States Department of Agriculture began using  as a plant introduction garden. As early as 1940 the county expressed an interest in acquiring the remaining property. In 1947 an additional  was added to the garden leaving  and the property was declared surplus by the War Department. In 1949, the University of Miami (UM) bought  for the Rosenstiel School of Marine and Atmospheric Science and the county the remaining . UM did not utilize their portion and in 1956 a local developer took their portion under a long term lease to build a golf course. This portion has gone through several owners. In 1990 it was then called Deering Bay and owned by Armando Codina and others and the lease was extended through 2030. Little has been done to develop the park since the county acquired it in 1949. Money from the Decade of Progress bonds in 1972 led to the construction of three lighted baseball fields. The county does have plans to improve the park sometime in the future.

Facilities
The park features three baseball fields. Both the Howard Palmetto Khoury League  and the Howard Palmetto Baseball/Softball Association formerly played at the park.  The baseball/softball fields and related batting cages, etc. were closed due to environmental concerns (arsenic contamination) in 2014 and are now overgrown.  There is a canoe and kayak ramp as well, which remain open and accessible.

References
Notes

Bibliography

 
 

Parks in Miami-Dade County, Florida